Stádlec is a market town in Tábor District in the South Bohemian Region of the Czech Republic. It has about 600 inhabitants.

Administrative parts
Villages of Hájky, Křída, Slavňovice and Staré Sedlo are administrative parts of Stádlec.

Geography
It lies in the Tábor Uplands. The Lužnice River forms the eastern municipal border. There are several fish ponds in the municipal territory, the largest of them is Mlýnský Stádlec.

History
The first written mention of Stádlec is from 1287, when it was a property of Zavis of Falkenstein.

Sights
Stádlec is known for its rare Stádlec Suspension Bridge over the Lužnice. It connects Stádlec with the village of Dobřejice (a part of Malšice).

Notable people
František Křižík (1847–1941), engineer and inventor; died here

References

External links

Populated places in Tábor District
Market towns in the Czech Republic